Prior to its uniform adoption of proportional representation in 1999, the United Kingdom used first-past-the-post for the European elections in England, Scotland and Wales. The European Parliament constituencies used under that system were smaller than the later regional constituencies and only had one Member of the European Parliament each.

The constituency of Liverpool was one of them.

When it was created in England in 1979, it consisted of the Westminster Parliament constituencies of Bootle, Liverpool Edge Hill, Liverpool Garston, Liverpool Kirkdale, Liverpool Scotland Exchange, Liverpool Toxteth, Liverpool Walton, Liverpool Wavertree, Liverpool West Derby.

Member of the European Parliament

Results

References

External links
 David Boothroyd's United Kingdom Election Results

European Parliament constituencies in England (1979–1999)
Politics of Liverpool
1979 establishments in England
1984 disestablishments in England
Constituencies established in 1979
Constituencies disestablished in 1984